A cliffhanger is a plot device as an ending of a fictional work.

Cliffhanger(s) or Cliff Hanger(s) may also refer to:

Film and television
 Cliffhanger (film), 1993 action film starring Sylvester Stallone and John Lithgow
 Cliffhangers (TV series), American television series
 Cliff Hanger (Between the Lions), recurring character on the children's television series Between the Lions
 Cliff Hangers, a pricing game on the game show The Price Is Right
 "The Cliffhanger", an episode of The O.C.

Music
 Cliff Hanger (album), 1985 album by Jimmy Cliff
 Cliffhanger (band), Dutch Progressive Rock band 
 "Cliffhanger", a song by Man Overboard from Heavy Love

Comics
 Cliffhanger (comics), an imprint (brand name) of the comic book publisher Wildstorm
 Cliff Hanger (comic strip), two separate 1983 comic strips

Video games
 Cliffhanger (video game) video game based on the 1993 film
 Cliff Hanger (video game), 1983 laserdisc video game based on the manga and anime series Lupin III

Amusement parks
 Cliffhanger (Colorado roller coaster), at Glenwood Caverns Adventure Park, Glenwood Springs, Colorado
 Cliffhanger (ride), type of amusement park ride